The 1921 Chicago Staleys season was their second regular season completed in the young American Professional Football Association. The team improved on their 10–1–2 record from 1920 to a 9–1–1 record under head coach/player George Halas earning them a first-place finish in the team standings and their first league championship. The beginning of the season saw A.E. Staley turn over the team to Halas and Dutch Sternaman, who moved the team to Chicago. The team name was changed from the Decatur Staleys to the Chicago Staleys due to a contract between Staley and Halas. The Staleys were quite dominant, but all of Chicago's games were played at home (including one game in Decatur). Two games were against the Buffalo All-Americans; the first, played on Thanksgiving, was won by Buffalo 7–6, giving the Staleys their only loss of the season.

Ed "Dutch" Sternaman and George Halas starred again, with newcomer Gaylord Stinchcomb also contributing. Sternaman scored 32 points, most by kicking, and threw one touchdown pass. Halas had 3 TD receptions while Stinchcomb led the team with 4 touchdown runs.

De facto championship game

The All-Americans agreed to rematch the Staleys on December 4 on the condition that the game would be considered a "post-season" exhibition game not to be counted in the standings; had it not, Buffalo would have had an undefeated season and won the title. (Buffalo had played, and defeated, the Akron Pros just one day prior.) Chicago defeated Buffalo in the rematch by a score of 10–7. Halas rebutted that the second game was played on December 4 (well before teams typically stopped playing games in those days), and the Staleys played two more games against top opponents, the Canton Bulldogs and Chicago Cardinals after the second Buffalo game (though, at the time of the Buffalo-Chicago matchup, Chicago had played three fewer games than Buffalo).

The league counted the All-Americans game in the standings, against Buffalo's wishes, resulting in Buffalo (9–1–2) and Chicago (9–1–1) being tied atop the standings. The league then implemented the first ever tiebreaker: a rule, now considered archaic and removed from league rulebooks, that states that if two teams play multiple times in a season, the last game between the two teams carries more weight. Thus, the Chicago victory actually counted more in the standings, giving Chicago the championship. Buffalo sports fans have been known to refer to this, justly or unjustly, as the "Staley Swindle."

Future Hall of Fame players
Guy Chamberlin, end
George Halas, end
George Trafton, center

Other leading players
Ed Sternaman, back
Gaylord Stinchcomb, back (rookie from Ohio State)

Departed players from 1920
Jimmy Conzelman, quarterback (went to Rock Island)
Paddy Driscoll, back (went to Chicago Cardinals)

Schedule

Standings

Awards
APFA Champions (1)

References
1921 Chicago Staleys season

Chicago Staleys
Chicago Bears seasons
National Football League championship seasons
Chicago Staleys